Guido III da Polenta (died 1389) was a lord of Ravenna, Italy and a member of the da Polenta family.

He peacefully held the city's government for 30 years after the death of his father, Bernardino I. Guido married the daughter of Obizzo III d'Este of Ferrara, Elisa d'Este, who gave him numerous children. Most of the daughters, including Samaritana da Polenta, married other lords of Romagna and northern Italy, such as Antonio I della Scala. 

In 1389 he was imprisoned by his sons Bernardino, Ostasio, Obizzo, Aldobrandino, Azzo and Pietro, and died in jail.

References 

 

1389 deaths
Guido III
Italian people who died in prison custody
14th-century Italian nobility
Year of birth unknown
Lords of Ravenna